Hoseynabad-e Vakil (also Romanized as Ḩoseynābād-e Vakīl) is a village in Fahraj Rural District, in the Central District of Fahraj County, Kerman Province, Iran. At the 2006 census, its population was 195, in 45 families.

References 

Populated places in Fahraj County